The Belarus–Latvia border is of length . In spans from the tripoint with Lithuania to the tripoint with Russia. It is an external border of the European Union.

The current border between the republics of Belarus (CIS member) and Latvia (EU member) was established after the dissolution of the Soviet Union and confirmed by an agreement of 21 February 1994 about the establishment of the border, finalized on April 10, 2013, in the agreement about the functioning of the border.

It also crosses the Lake Rychy and an island in the lake.
The border starts from the triple junction of the borders with Lithuania and continues to the east to the triple junction of the borders with Russia

Border crossings

The May 10, 2006 decree of the President of Belarus no. 313 established the following border crossings.

References

 
European Union external borders
1994 establishments in Belarus
1994 establishments in Latvia
1994 in international relations
Borders of Belarus
Borders of Latvia
International borders
Internal borders of the Soviet Union